Kim Bradley (born 7 September 1967 in Melbourne, Victoria) is an Australian former cricket player. She played for the Victorian state women's cricket team between 1992 and 1998. Bradley played two One Day Internationals for the Australia national women's cricket team.

References

External links
 Kim Bradley at CricketArchive
 Kim Bradley at southernstars.org.au

Living people
1967 births
Australia women One Day International cricketers
Sportswomen from Victoria (Australia)
Cricketers from Melbourne